The Macao Science Center also known as Macau Science Center (MSC;) is a science center in Sé, Macau, China. 

The main building has a distinctive, asymmetrical, conical shape with a spiral walkway and a large atrium inside. Galleries lead off the walkway, mainly consisting of interactive exhibits aimed at science education.

There is also a planetarium with 3D projection facilities and Omnimax films.

The building is in a prominent position by the sea and is now a landmark of Macau. It is visible when arriving on the ferry from Hong Kong.

History
The project to build the science center was conceived in 2001 and completed in 2009. The building was designed by Pei Partnership Architects in association with I. M. Pei and construction started in 2006. The structural engineer was Leslie E. Robertson Associates. The center was opened in December 2009 by Chinese President and General Secretary of the Communist Party Hu Jintao.

The center caught on fire on 20 November 2015, due to welding occurring on the top level of the building.

Gallery

See also 
 Macau Science and Culture Centre, Lisbon, Portugal
 List of museums in Macau

References

External links 

 
 Reference Page at Pei Architects

Museums established in 2009
Museums in Macau
Buildings and structures in Macau
Science museums in China
Tourist attractions in Macau
Science and technology in China
Planetaria in China
I. M. Pei buildings
IMAX venues
2009 establishments in Macau
Cultural infrastructure completed in 2009